Kokhav Nolad 9 is the 9th season of the popular reality TV show Kokhav Nolad, which focused on finding the next Israeli pop star. It is hosted by Tzvika Hadar with judges Margalit Tzan'ani, Tsedi Tzarfati and the Newest Miri Messika and Yair Nitzani. Rather than in Jerusalem as in the previous season, the final of Kochav Nolad 9 took place in Haifa in July 2011.

Participants

External links
Official website 

Kokhav Nolad seasons